Channel X Productions is a UK comedy and entertainment company with a 22–year history of producing programmes for all of the major broadcasters. The company specialises in scripted broken and narrative comedy, comedy-entertainment formats and game shows.

The company was formed in 1987 by Jonathan Ross and Alan Marke, and the former made his television presenting début as a stand-in presenter for Channel X program The Last Resort.
 
Channel X's Manchester based subsidiary, Channel K, has also won its first commissions in 2009, netting deals at the BBC and Channel 4.

Selected shows
The Last Resort with Jonathan Ross
Saturday Zoo with Jonathan Ross
Vic Reeves Big Night Out
Sean's Show
Shooting Stars
The Smell of Reeves and Mortimer
Bang Bang, It's Reeves and Mortimer
Catterick
Popetown
Blunder
Modern Toss
Snuff Box
So Awkward
Detectorists

Online
Channel X also produces an online comedy drama series called Chelsey OMG which airs on social networking website Bebo. By February 2009 the show had amassed almost 2,000,000 views.

References

External links
Channel X Website

Television production companies of the United Kingdom